Dick Strittmatter is a former American football coach  He served as the head football coach at Peru State College from 1995 to 2000 and at Briar Cliff College from 2002 to 2007, compiling a career college football record of 49–70

Coaching career
Strittmatter was the first head football coach at Briar Cliff College in Sioux City, Iowa and he held that position for six seasons, from 2002 until 2007.  His coaching record at Briar Cliff was 18–44.

Head coaching record

College

References

Year of birth missing (living people)
Living people
Briar Cliff Chargers football coaches
Peru State Bobcats football coaches
Western Illinois Leathernecks football coaches
Western Illinois Leathernecks football players
High school football coaches in Florida